Uruguay competed at the 2022 World Aquatics Championships in Budapest, Hungary from 18 June to 3 July.

Athletes by discipline
The following is the list of number of competitors participating at the Championships per discipline.

Artistic swimming

Women

Open water swimming

Men

Women

Swimming

Men

Women

References

Citations

General 

World Aquatics Championships
2022
Nations at the 2022 World Aquatics Championships